Spirogyra (common names include water silk, mermaid's tresses, and blanket weed) is a genus of filamentous charophyte green algae of the order Zygnematales, named for the helical or spiral arrangement of the chloroplasts that is characteristic of the genus. Spirogyra species, of which there are more than 400, are commonly found in freshwater habitats. Spirogyra measures approximately 10 to 100 μm in width and may grow to several centimetres in length. It is often observed as green slimy patches on the ground near ponds and other water bodies having stagnant water.

General characteristics
Spirogyra is very common in relatively clear eutrophic water, developing slimy filamentous green masses. In spring Spirogyra grows under water, but when there is enough sunlight and warmth they produce large amounts of oxygen, adhering as bubbles between the tangled filaments. The filamentous masses come to the surface and become visible as slimy green mats. Spirogyra has a cell wall, nucleus, pyrenoid, and spiral chloroplasts.

Reproduction

Spirogyra can reproduce both sexually and asexually. In vegetative reproduction, fragmentation takes place, and Spirogyra simply undergoes intercalary cell division to extend the length of the new filaments.

Sexual reproduction is of two types:
 Scalariform conjugation requires association of two or more different filaments lined side by side, either partially or throughout their length. One cell each from opposite lined filaments emits tubular protuberances known as conjugation tubes, which elongate and fuse to make a passage called the conjugation canal. The cytoplasm of the cell acting as the male travels through this tube and fuses with the female cytoplasm, and the gametes fuse to form a zygospore. 
 In lateral conjugation, gametes are formed in a single filament. Two adjoining cells near the common transverse wall give out protuberances known as conjugation tubes, which further form the conjugation canal upon contact. The male cytoplasm migrates through the conjugation canal, fusing with the female. The rest of the process proceeds as in scalariform conjugation.

The essential difference is that scalariform conjugation occurs between two filaments and lateral conjugation occurs between two adjacent cells on the same filament.

Species
The following species are currently accepted:

 Spirogyra abbreviata Zheng
 Spirogyra acanthophora (Skuja) Czurda
 Spirogyra acumbentis Vodenicarov
 Spirogyra adjerensis Gauthier-Lièvre
 Spirogyra adnata (Vaucher) Kützing
 Spirogyra adornata Ling
 Spirogyra aequinoctialis G.S.West
 Spirogyra affinis (Hassall) Petit
 Spirogyra africana (F.E.Fritsch) Czurda
 Spirogyra ahmedabadensis Kamat
 Spirogyra alpina Kützing
 Spirogyra alternata Kützing
 Spirogyra amplectens Skuja
 Spirogyra ampliata L.Liu
 Spirogyra anchora Skuja
 Spirogyra angolensis Welwitsch
 Spirogyra angulata Nipkow
 Spirogyra anomala Bhashyakarla Rao
 Spirogyra anzygoapora Singh
 Spirogyra aphanosculpta Skuja
 Spirogyra aplanospora Randhawa
 Spirogyra arcta (C.Agardh) Endlichter
 Spirogyra arcuata Liu
 Spirogyra areolata Lagerheim
 Spirogyra arizonensis Rickert & Hoshaw
 Spirogyra arthuri Woodhead & Tweed
 Spirogyra articulata Transeau
 Spirogyra asiatica Czurda
 Spirogyra atasiana Czurda
 Spirogyra atrobrunnea Gauthier-Lièvre
 Spirogyra aubvillei Gauthier-Lièvre
 Spirogyra australica Czurda
 Spirogyra australiensis K.Möbius
 Spirogyra austriaca Czurda
 Spirogyra azygospora Singh
 Spirogyra baileyi Schmidle
 Spirogyra batekiana Gauthier-Lièvre
 Spirogyra bellis (Hassall) P.Crouan & H.Crouan
 Spirogyra bicalyptrata Czurda
 Spirogyra bichromatophora (Randhawa) Transeau
 Spirogyra biformis C.-C.Jao
 Spirogyra biharensis A.M.Verma & B.Kumari
 Spirogyra bii Kadlubowska
 Spirogyra bireticulata Liu
 Spirogyra borealis Zheng & Ling
 Spirogyra borgeana Transeau
 Spirogyra borgei Kadlubowska
 Spirogyra borkuense Gauthier-Lièvre
 Spirogyra borysthenica Kasanowsky & Smirnoff [Smirnov]
 Spirogyra bourrellyana Gauthier-Lièvre
 Spirogyra braziliensis (Nordstedt) Transeau
 Spirogyra britannica Godward
 Spirogyra brunnea Czurda
 Spirogyra buchetii Petit
 Spirogyra bullata C.-C.Jao
 Spirogyra calcarea Transeau
 Spirogyra calchaquiesiae B.Tracanna
 Spirogyra californica Stancheva, J.D.Hall, McCourt & Sheath
 Spirogyra calospora Cleve
 Spirogyra canaliculata Segar
 Spirogyra cardinia S.H.Lewis
 Spirogyra caroliniana G.E.Dillard
 Spirogyra castanacea G.C.Couch
 Spirogyra cataeniformis (Hassall) Kützing
 Spirogyra catenaeformis (Hassall) Kützing
 Spirogyra cavata Vodenicarov
 Spirogyra chakiaensis (Bhashyakarla Rao) Kreiger
 Spirogyra chandigarhensis
 Spirogyra chekiangensis C.-C.Jao
 Spirogyra chenii C.-C.Jao
 Spirogyra chungkingensis C.-C.Jao
 Spirogyra chuniae C.-C.Jao
 Spirogyra circumlineata Transeau
 Spirogyra clavata Segar
 Spirogyra cleveana Transeau
 Spirogyra colligata Hodgetts
 Spirogyra columbiana Czurda
 Spirogyra communis (Hassall) Kützing
 Spirogyra condensata (Vaucher) Dumortier
 Spirogyra congolensis Gauthier-Lièvre
 Spirogyra conspicua Gay
 Spirogyra convoluta
 Spirogyra corrugata Woodhead & Tweed
 Spirogyra costata Kadlubowska
 Spirogyra costulata Kadlubowska
 Spirogyra coumbiana Czurda
 Spirogyra crassa (Kützing) Kützing
 Spirogyra crassispina C.-C.Jao
 Spirogyra crassiuscula (Wittrock & Nordstedt) Transeau
 Spirogyra crassivallicularis C.-C.Jao
 Spirogyra crassoidea (Transeau) Transeau
 Spirogyra crenulata Singh
 Spirogyra croasdaleae Blum
 Spirogyra cyanosporum
 Spirogyra cylindrica Czurda
 Spirogyra cylindrosperma (West & G.S.West) Krieger
 Spirogyra cylindrospora West & G.S.West
 Spirogyra czubinskii Kadlubowska
 Spirogyra czurdae Misra
 Spirogyra czurdiana Kadlubowska
 Spirogyra dacimina (O.F.Müller) Kützing
 Spirogyra daedalea Lagerheim
 Spirogyra daedaleoides Czurda
 Spirogyra danica Kadlubowska
 Spirogyra decimina (O.F.Müller) Dumortier
 Spirogyra densa Kützing
 Spirogyra denticulata Transeau
 Spirogyra dentireticulata C.-C.Jao
 Spirogyra desikacharyensis Rattan
 Spirogyra dialyderma Ling & Zheng
 Spirogyra dicephala C.-C.Jao & H.Z.Zhu
 Spirogyra dictyospora C.-C.Jao
 Spirogyra diluta H.C.Wood
 Spirogyra dimorpha Geitler
 Spirogyra discoidea Transeau
 Spirogyra distenta Transeau
 Spirogyra diversizygotica (V.I.Polyanskij) L.A.Rundina
 Spirogyra djalonensis Gauthier-Lièvre
 Spirogyra djiliense Gauthier-Lièvre
 Spirogyra dodgeana
 Spirogyra drilonensis Petkoff
 Spirogyra dubia Kützing
 Spirogyra echinata Tiffany
 Spirogyra echinospora Blum
 Spirogyra eillipsospora Transeau
 Spirogyra elegans Wollny
 Spirogyra elegantissima Y.J.Ling & Y.M.Zheng
 Spirogyra ellipsospora Transeau
 Spirogyra elliptica C.-C.Jao
 Spirogyra elongata (H.C.Wood) H.C.Wood
 Spirogyra elongata (Vaucher) Dumortier
 Spirogyra emilianensis Bonhomme
 Spirogyra endogranulata O.Bock & W.Bock
 Spirogyra exilis West & G.S.West
 Spirogyra fallax (Hansgirg) Wille
 Spirogyra fassula Zheng
 Spirogyra favosa Y.-X.Wei & Y.-K.Yung
 Spirogyra fennica Cedercreutz
 Spirogyra ferruginea H.W.Liang
 Spirogyra flavescens (Hassall) Kützing
 Spirogyra flavicans Kützing
 Spirogyra fluviatilis Hilse
 Spirogyra formosa (Transeau) Czurda
 Spirogyra fossa C.-C.Jao
 Spirogyra fossulata C.-C.Jao & Hu
 Spirogyra foveolata (Transeau) Czurda
 Spirogyra franconica O.Bock & W.Bock
 Spirogyra frankliniana Tiffany
 Spirogyra frigida F.Gay
 Spirogyra fritschiana Czurda
 Spirogyra fukienica Wei
 Spirogyra fuzhouensis H.-J.Hu
 Spirogyra gallica Petit
 Spirogyra gaterslebensis Reith
 Spirogyra gauthier-lievrae Kadlubowska
 Spirogyra gauthieri Gayral
 Spirogyra gharbensis Gauthier-Lièvre
 Spirogyra ghosei Singh
 Spirogyra gibberosa C.-C.Jao
 Spirogyra glabra Czurda
 Spirogyra globulispora Gauthier-Lièvre
 Spirogyra gobonensis Gauthier-Lièvre
 Spirogyra goetzei Schmidle
 Spirogyra gracilis Kützing
 Spirogyra granulata C.-C.Jao
 Spirogyra gratiana Transeau
 Spirogyra groenlandica Rosenvinge
 Spirogyra guangchowensis Zhu & Zhong
 Spirogyra guineense Gauthier-Lièvre
 Spirogyra gujaratensis Kamat
 Spirogyra gurdaspurensis Rattan
 Spirogyra haimenensis C.-C.Jao
 Spirogyra hartigii (Kützing) De Toni
 Spirogyra hassalii (Jenner) Petit
 Spirogyra hassallii (Jenner ex Hassall) P.Crouan & H.Crouan
 Spirogyra hatillensis Transeau
 Spirogyra heeriana Nägeli ex Kützing
 Spirogyra henanensis (L.J.Bi) L.J.Bi
 Spirogyra herbipolensis O.Bock & W.Bock
 Spirogyra heterospora Liu
 Spirogyra hoehnei O.Borge
 Spirogyra hoggarica (Gauthier-Lièvre) Gauthier-Lièvre
 Spirogyra hollandiae Taft
 Spirogyra hopeiensis C.-C.Jao
 Spirogyra hunanensis C.-C.Jao
 Spirogyra hungarica Langer
 Spirogyra hyalina Cleve
 Spirogyra hymerae Britton & B.H.Smith
 Spirogyra inconstans Collins
 Spirogyra incrassata Czurda
 Spirogyra indica Krieger
 Spirogyra inflata (Vaucher) Dumortier
 Spirogyra insignis (Hassall) Kützing
 Spirogyra insueta Zhu & Zhong
 Spirogyra intermedia Rabenhorst
 Spirogyra intorta C.-C.Jao
 Spirogyra ionia Wade
 Spirogyra irregularis Nägeli ex Kützing
 Spirogyra ivorensis Gauthier-Lièvre
 Spirogyra iyengarii Kadlubowska
 Spirogyra jaoensis Randhawa
 Spirogyra jaoi S.H.Ley
 Spirogyra jassiensis (Teodoresco) Czurda
 Spirogyra jatobae Transeau
 Spirogyra jogensis Iyengar
 Spirogyra jugalis (Dillwyn) Kützing
 Spirogyra juliana Stancheva, J.D.Hall, McCourt & Sheath
 Spirogyra kaffirita Transeau
 Spirogyra kamatii Kamat
 Spirogyra karnalae Randhawa
 Spirogyra kolae Hajdu
 Spirogyra koreana J.-H.Kim, Y.H.Kim, & I.K.Lee
 Spirogyra krubergii V.J.Poljanski
 Spirogyra kundaensis Singh
 Spirogyra kuusamoensis Hirn
 Spirogyra labbei Gauthier-Lièvre
 Spirogyra labyrinthica Transeau
 Spirogyra lacustris Czurda
 Spirogyra lagerheimii Wittrock
 Spirogyra laka Kützing
 Spirogyra lallandiae Taft
 Spirogyra lambertiana Transeau
 Spirogyra lamellata (Bhashyakarla Rao) Krieger
 Spirogyra lamellosa C.-C.Jao
 Spirogyra lapponica Lagerheim
 Spirogyra latireticulata Zheng & Ling
 Spirogyra latviensis Czurda
 Spirogyra laxa Kützing
 Spirogyra laxistrata C.-C.Jao
 Spirogyra lenticularis Transeau
 Spirogyra lentiformis L.J.Bi
 Spirogyra lians Transeau
 Spirogyra libyca Gauthier-Lièvre
 Spirogyra lismorensis Playfair
 Spirogyra lodziensis Kadlubowska
 Spirogyra longifissa Wei
 Spirogyra lubrica Kützing
 Spirogyra lucknowensis (Prasad & Dutta) Kadlubowska
 Spirogyra lushanensis L.C.Li
 Spirogyra luteospora Czurda
 Spirogyra lutetiana Petit
 Spirogyra lymerae Britton & Smith
 Spirogyra macrospora (C.B.Rao) Krieger
 Spirogyra maghrebiana Gauthier-Lièvre
 Spirogyra major Kützing
 Spirogyra majuscula Kützing
 Spirogyra malmeana Hirn
 Spirogyra manormae Randhawa
 Spirogyra maravillosa Transeau
 Spirogyra marchica H.Krieger
 Spirogyra margalefii Aboal & Llimona
 Spirogyra margaritata Wollny
 Spirogyra marocana Gauthier-Lièvre
 Spirogyra maxima (Hassall) Wittrock
 Spirogyra megaspora Transeau
 Spirogyra meinningensis
 Spirogyra meridionalis W.J.Zhu & Zhong
 Spirogyra miamiana Taft
 Spirogyra microdictyon C.-C.Jao & Hu
 Spirogyra microgranulata C.-C.Jao
 Spirogyra micropunctata Transeau
 Spirogyra microspora C.-C.Jao
 Spirogyra mienningensis L.-C.Li
 Spirogyra minor (Schmidle) Transeau
 Spirogyra minuticrassoidea Yamagishi
 Spirogyra minutifossa C.-C.Jao
 Spirogyra mirabilis (Hassall) Kützing
 Spirogyra miranda Kadlubowska
 Spirogyra mirifica Zheng & Ling
 Spirogyra mithalaensis A.M.Verma & B.Kumari
 Spirogyra moebii Transeau
 Spirogyra monodiana Gauthier-Lièvre
 Spirogyra montserrati Margalef
 Spirogyra multiconjugata N.C.Ferrer & E.J.Cáceres
 Spirogyra multiformis Kadlubowska
 Spirogyra multistrata Zheng & Ling
 Spirogyra multitrata Zheng & Ling
 Spirogyra mutabilis C.-C.Jao & H.J.Hu
 Spirogyra narcissiana Transeau
 Spirogyra natchita Transeau
 Spirogyra nawaschinii Kasanowsky
 Spirogyra neglecta (Hassall) Kützing
 Spirogyra neorhizobranchialis C.-C.Jao & Zheng
 Spirogyra nitida (O.F.Müller) Leiblein
 Spirogyra nodifera O.Bock & W.Bock
 Spirogyra notabilis Taft
 Spirogyra nova-angliae Transeau
 Spirogyra novae-angliae Transeau
 Spirogyra nyctigama Taft
 Spirogyra oblata C.-C.Jao
 Spirogyra oblonga Liu
 Spirogyra obovata C.-C.Jao
 Spirogyra occidentalis (Transeau) Czurda
 Spirogyra oligocarpa C.-C.Jao
 Spirogyra olivascens Rabenhorst
 Spirogyra ollicola C.-C.Jao & Zhong
 Spirogyra oltmannsii Huber-Pestalozzi
 Spirogyra orientalis West & G.S.West
 Spirogyra orthospira Nägeli
 Spirogyra ouarsenica Gauthier-Lièvre
 Spirogyra oudhensis Randhawa
 Spirogyra ovigera Montagne
 Spirogyra pachyderma Gauthier-Lièvre
 Spirogyra palghatensis Erady
 Spirogyra paludosa Czurda
 Spirogyra papulata C.-C.Jao
 Spirogyra paradoxa Bhashyakarla Rao
 Spirogyra paraguayensis O.Borge
 Spirogyra parva (Hassall) Kützing
 Spirogyra parvispora H.C.Wood
 Spirogyra parvula (Transeau) Czurda
 Spirogyra pascheriana Czurda
 Spirogyra patliputri A.M.Verma & B.Kumari
 Spirogyra peipeingensis C.-C.Jao
 Spirogyra pellucida (Hassall) Kützing
 Spirogyra perforans Transeau
 Spirogyra plena (West & G.S.West) Czurda
 Spirogyra poljanskii Kadlubowska
 Spirogyra polymorpha Kirchner
 Spirogyra polytaeniata Strasburger
 Spirogyra porangabae Transeau
 Spirogyra porticalis (O.F.Müller) Dumortier- type
 Spirogyra pratensis Transeau
 Spirogyra princeps (Vaucher) Link ex Meyen
 Spirogyra proavita Langer
 Spirogyra prolifica Kamat
 Spirogyra propria Transeau
 Spirogyra protecta H.C.Wood
 Spirogyra pseudoaedaloides Kadlubowska
 Spirogyra pseudobellis W.J.Zhu & Zhong
 Spirogyra pseudocorrugata Gauthier-Lièvre
 Spirogyra pseudocylindrica Prescott
 Spirogyra pseudogibberosa Gauthier-Lièvre
 Spirogyra pseudogranulata S.-H.Ley
 Spirogyra pseudojuergensii H.Silva
 Spirogyra pseudomaiuscula Gauthier-Lièvre
 Spirogyra pseudomajuscula Gauthier-Lièvre
 Spirogyra pseudomaxima Kadlubowska
 Spirogyra pseudoneglecta Czurda
 Spirogyra pseudonodifera O.Bock & W.Bock
 Spirogyra pseudoplena Liu
 Spirogyra pseudopulchrata C.-C.Jao
 Spirogyra pseudoreticulata Kreiger
 Spirogyra pseudorhizopus L.J.Bi
 Spirogyra pseudosahnii Kadlubowska
 Spirogyra pseudospreeiana C.-C.Jao
 Spirogyra pseudosubreticulata Rickert & Hoshaw
 Spirogyra pseudotenuissima O.Bock & W.Bock
 Spirogyra pseudotetrapla Kadlubowska
 Spirogyra pseudotexensis Bourrelly
 Spirogyra pseudovarians Czurda
 Spirogyra pseudovenusta Liu & Wei
 Spirogyra pseudowoodii V.J.Poljanski
 Spirogyra pulchella (H.C.Wood) H.C.Wood
 Spirogyra pulchra Alexenko
 Spirogyra pulchrifigurata C.-C.Jao
 Spirogyra puncticulata C.-C.Jao
 Spirogyra punctulata C.-C.Jao
 Spirogyra quadrata (Hassall) P.Petit
 Spirogyra quadrilaminata C.-C.Jao
 Spirogyra quezelii Gauthier-Lièvre
 Spirogyra quilonensis Kothari
 Spirogyra quinina Kützing
 Spirogyra quinquilaminata C.-C.Jao
 Spirogyra randhawae Krieger
 Spirogyra rattanii Kadlubowska
 Spirogyra rectangularis Transeau
 Spirogyra rectispira Merriman
 Spirogyra regularis (Cedercreutz) Krieger
 Spirogyra reinhardii V.Chmielevsky
 Spirogyra reticulata Nordstedt
 Spirogyra reticulatum Randhawa
 Spirogyra reticuliana Randhawa
 Spirogyra rhizobrachialis C.-C.Jao
 Spirogyra rhizobranchialis C.-C.Jao
 Spirogyra rhizoides Randhawa
 Spirogyra rhizopus C.-C.Jao
 Spirogyra rhodopea Petkoff
 Spirogyra rivularis (Hassall) Rabenhorst
 Spirogyra robusta (Nygaard) Czurda
 Spirogyra rugosa (Transeau) Czurda
 Spirogyra rugulosa Iwanoff
 Spirogyra rupestris Schmidle
 Spirogyra sahnii Randhawa
 Spirogyra salina Aleem
 Spirogyra sanjingensis Y.Wang & Z.Wang
 Spirogyra sarmae M.Singh & M.Srivastava
 Spirogyra schmidtii West & G.S.West
 Spirogyra schweickerdtii Cholonky
 Spirogyra scripta Nygaard
 Spirogyra scrobiculata (Stockmayer) Czurda
 Spirogyra sculpta Gauthier-Lièvre
 Spirogyra semiornata C.-C.Jao
 Spirogyra senegalensis Gauthier-Lièvre
 Spirogyra setiformis (Roth) Martens ex Meneghini
 Spirogyra shantungensis L.-C.Li
 Spirogyra shanxiensis Zheng & Ling
 Spirogyra shenzaensis Zheng
 Spirogyra siamensis Transeau
 Spirogyra siberica Skvortzov
 Spirogyra silesiaca Kadlubowska
 Spirogyra sinensis L.-C.Li
 Spirogyra singularis Nordstedt
 Spirogyra skujae Randhawa
 Spirogyra skvortzowii Willi Kreiger
 Spirogyra smithii Transeau
 Spirogyra speciosa Liu
 Spirogyra sphaerica (Misra) Willi Krieger
 Spirogyra sphaerocarpa C.-C.Jao
 Spirogyra sphaerospora Hirn
 Spirogyra spinescens Kirjakov
 Spirogyra splendida G.S West
 Spirogyra spreeiana Rabenhorst
 Spirogyra subaffinis F.E.Fritsch & M.F.Rich
 Spirogyra subbullata Kadlubowska
 Spirogyra subcolligata L.J.Bi
 Spirogyra subcrassa Woronchin
 Spirogyra subcrassiuscula L.J.Bi
 Spirogyra subcylindrospora C.-C.Jao
 Spirogyra subechinata Godward
 Spirogyra subfossulata C.-C.Jao
 Spirogyra subglabra Zheng & Ling
 Spirogyra sublambertiana Zhao
 Spirogyra subluteospora C.-C.Jao & Hu
 Spirogyra submajuscula Ling & Zheng
 Spirogyra submargaritata Godward
 Spirogyra submarina (Collins) Transeau
 Spirogyra submaxima Transeau
 Spirogyra subobovata Chian
 Spirogyra subpapulatata C.-C.Jao
 Spirogyra subpellucida C.-C.Jao
 Spirogyra subpolytaeniata C.-C.Jao
 Spirogyra subpratensis Woronichin
 Spirogyra subreflexa Liang & Wang
 Spirogyra subreticulata F.E.Fritsch
 Spirogyra subsalina Cedercreutz
 Spirogyra subsalsa Kützing
 Spirogyra subsalso-punctatulata Kadlubowska
 Spirogyra subtropica Chian
 Spirogyra suburbana C.-C.Jao
 Spirogyra subvelata Kreiger
 Spirogyra sulcata Blum
 Spirogyra sundanensis Gauthier-Lièvre
 Spirogyra superba L.Liu
 Spirogyra supervarians Transeau
 Spirogyra szechwanensis C.-C.Jao
 Spirogyra taftiana Transeau
 Spirogyra taiyuanensis Ling
 Spirogyra tandae Randhawa
 Spirogyra taylorii C.-C.Jao
 Spirogyra tenuior (Transeau) Krieger
 Spirogyra tenuispina Rundina
 Spirogyra tenuissima (Hassall) Kützing
 Spirogyra teodoresci Transeau
 Spirogyra ternata Ripart
 Spirogyra tetrapla Transeau
 Spirogyra tibetensis C.-C.Jao
 Spirogyra tjibodensis Faber
 Spirogyra tolosana Comère
 Spirogyra torta Blum
 Spirogyra trachycarpa Skuja
 Spirogyra transeauiana C.-C.Jao
 Spirogyra triplicata (Collins) Transeau
 Spirogyra trochainii Gauthier-Lièvre
 Spirogyra tropica Kützing
 Spirogyra tsingtaoensis L.-C.Li
 Spirogyra tuberculata Lagerheim
 Spirogyra tuberculosa Liang & Wang
 Spirogyra tucumaniae B.Tracanna
 Spirogyra tumida C.-C.Jao
 Spirogyra turfosa F.Gay
 Spirogyra tuwensis R.J.Patel & C.K.Asok Kumar
 Spirogyra ugandense Gauthier-Lièvre
 Spirogyra unduliseptum Randhawa
 Spirogyra urbana C.-C.Jao & Zhong
 Spirogyra van-zantenii Cholonky
 Spirogyra variabilis C.-C.Jao & Hu
 Spirogyra varians (Hassall) Kützing
 Spirogyra variaspora Rickert & Hoshaw
 Spirogyra variformis Transeau
 Spirogyra varshaii Prasad & Dutta
 Spirogyra vasishtii Rattan
 Spirogyra velata Nordstedt
 Spirogyra venkataramanii Rattan
 Spirogyra venosa Kadlubowska
 Spirogyra venusta C.-C.Jao
 Spirogyra vermiculata C.-C.Jao & H.J.Hu
 Spirogyra verrucogranulata I.C A.Dias & C.E.de M.Bicudo
 Spirogyra verrucosa (C.B.Rao) Krieger
 Spirogyra verruculosa C.-C.Jao
 Spirogyra voltaica Gauthier-Lièvre
 Spirogyra wangii L.C.Li
 Spirogyra weberi Kützing
 Spirogyra weishuiensis Ling & Zheng
 Spirogyra weletischii West & G.S.West
 Spirogyra welwitschii West & G.S.West
 Spirogyra westii Transeau
 Spirogyra willei Skuja
 Spirogyra wittrockii Alexenko
 Spirogyra wollnyi De Toni
 Spirogyra wrightiana Transeau
 Spirogyra wuchanensis C.-C.Jao & H.-J.Hu
 Spirogyra wuhanensis C.-C.Jao & H.-J.Hu
 Spirogyra xiaoganensis Liu
 Spirogyra xinxiangensis L.J.Bi
 Spirogyra yexianensis L.J.Bi
 Spirogyra yuin S.Skinner & Entwisle
 Spirogyra yunnanensis L.-C.Li C

Trivia
American jazz fusion band Spyro Gyra was named after this genus of algae.

It is also the subject of the Brazilian sambarock song "Spirogyra story" by Jorge Ben.

Gallery

References

 Spirogyra at microscopy-uk.org.uk
 John Whitton, B.A. and Brook, A.J. (editors) 2002. The Freshwater Algal Flora of the British Isles. Cambridge University Press, Cambridge. .

Zygnemataceae